Semiotext(e) is an independent publisher of critical theory, fiction, philosophy, art criticism, activist texts and non-fiction.

History
Founded in 1974, Semiotext(e) began as a journal that emerged from a semiotics reading group led by Sylvère Lotringer at the Columbia University philosophy department. Initially, the magazine was devoted to readings of thinkers like Nietzsche and Saussure. In 1978, Lotringer and his collaborators published a special issue, Schizo-Culture, in the wake of  a conference of the same name he had organized two years before at Columbia University. 
The magazine brought together artists and thinkers such as Gilles Deleuze, Kathy Acker, John Cage, Michel Foucault, Jack Smith, Martine Barrat and Lee Breuer. Schizo-Culture brought out connections between high theory and underground culture that had not yet been made, and forged the "high/low" aesthetic that remains central to the Semiotext(e) project.

As the group dispersed over time, issues appeared less frequently. In 1980, Lotringer began to assemble the Foreign Agents series, a group of "little black books", often culled from longer texts, to polemically debut the work of French theorists to US readers. He was aided in this by Jim Fleming, whose collective press Autonomedia would be Semiotext(e)'s distributor for the next twenty-one years.  Jean Baudrillard’s Simulations was the first of these books to appear, followed by titles by Gilles Deleuze, Felix Guattari, Paul Virilio, Jean-François Lyotard and Michel Foucault, among others. Spin magazine cited the little black books as "Objects of Desire" in a 19XX design feature.

In 1990, Chris Kraus proposed a new series of fiction books by American writers, which would become the "Native Agents" imprint. Kraus worked at the St. Marks Poetry Project and saw an overlap between the theories of subjectivity advanced in the Foreign Agents books and the radical subjectivity practiced by female first-person fiction writers. Designed to promote an anti-memoiristic "public I", the series published Kathy Acker, Barbara Barg, Cookie Mueller, Eileen Myles, David Rattray, Ann Rower, Lynne Tillman and many others.

A third series, Active Agents, began in 1993 with the publication of Still Black Still Strong by Dhoruba Bin Wahad, Assata Shakur and Mumia Abu-Jamal, with the goal of presenting explicitly political, topical material. It has also published texts by Kate Zambreno, Bruce Hainley, and Eileen Myles.

In 2001 Semiotext(e) changed its base of operations from New York to Los Angeles, ceasing its involvement with Autonomedia in order to begin an ongoing distribution arrangement with MIT Press. Hedi El Kholti, the Moroccan-born artist and writer who co-founded the now-defunct Dilettante Press, became Semiotext(e)’s art director.

As the decade progressed, El Kholti saw a need to re-imagine the Semiotext(e) project beyond the small-format books of the series. Earlier titles would be republished as large format books within the new "History of the Present" imprint.

In 2004, El Kholti became managing editor of the press. He, Kraus and Lotringer became joint, list-wide co-editors. Semiotext(e)'s new goal was to advance its original conflation of literature and theory, and to expand the anti-bourgeois queer theory presented in early issues of the Semiotext(e) journal.

The purview of Native Agents expanded to include science fiction books by Maurice Dantec and Mark Von Schlegell and works by writers like Tony Duvert, Pierre Guyotat, Travis Jeppesen, Grisélidis Real, Bruce Benderson, and Abdellah Taïa. Aware that the theorists he introduced in the 1980s had by now been absorbed into the academic mainstream, Sylvère Lotringer turned his attention to Italy's post-Autonomia critical theory, commissioning and publishing works by Franco 'Bifo' Berardi, Paolo Virno, Antonio Negri, Christian Marazzi [fr], Maurizio Lazzarato and others. Semiotext(e) also became the English-language publisher for Peter Sloterdijk’s notable Spheres trilogy. Re-visioning New York's ‘last avant-garde’ of the 1980s, Semiotext(e)  published archival works by or about some of that era's most important artists, including Penny Arcade, Gary Indiana and David Wojnarowicz.

Semiotext(e) was invited to participate as an artist in the 2014 Whitney Biennial.

Semiotext(e) Intervention Series

Semiotext(e) publishes the Intervention Series (2009—present), an ongoing series of short books on subjects related to left-wing politics.  Topics of the series include anti-capitalism, anti-authoritarianism, post-structuralism, feminism, and economics.  All books in the series are designed by Hedi El Kholti.  The series is notable for its first installment: The Coming Insurrection by The Invisible Committee, a French pseudonymous author (or authors).  Upon its release, the book was condemned by American conservative commentator Glenn Beck, who described it as a dangerous radical leftist manifesto.  The Coming Insurrection is also known for its association with the legal case of the Tarnac Nine, a group of nine people including Julien Coupat who were arrested in Tarnac, rural France, on November 11, 2008 on suspicion of sabotaging French railways.  The method of sabotage actually used was similar to one suggested in the book, and members of the group were suspected to be members of the Invisible Committee.  Coupat co-founded Tiqqun, a short-lived philosophical magazine which is also represented in the Intervention Series.

Major topics of the series include French anarchism (The Invisible Committee, Tiqqun), Italian Marxist economic criticism (Maurizio Lazzarato, Franco Berardi, Christian Marazzi) and violence in the context of the Mexican Drug War (Sergio González Rodríguez, Sayak Valencia).  Other topics discussed include art history (Gerald Raunig, Chris Kraus), racism and criminal justice system (Houria Bouteldja, Jackie Wang), continental philosophy (Jean Baudrillard, Peter Sloterdijk) and contemporary culture (François Cusset, Jennifer Doyle, Paul Virilio).

Although the series treats a variety of subjects in left-wing politics and culture, there are also commonalities and throughlines among the works.  Several of the series' entries treat the Financial crisis of 2007–2008 and the consequent protest movements of the early 21st century, particularly Occupy Wall Street and the Arab Spring; these are compared by several of the series' authors with the French protests of May 1968 and the Italian Years of lead.  In the context of these protest movements, authors in the series describe a tendency to refuse to seize political power, thus also refusing to engage with states, businesses, and traditional power entities in expected ways.  This refusal of power is also described as "destituent".  20th century continental philosophy is frequently cited by the series' authors for various purposes, particularly the work of Deleuze and Guattari, Michel Foucault, and Giorgio Agamben.  Several of the series' authors decry the state of exception, a legal theory due to the German jurist Carl Schmitt (and later criticized by Agamben), which posits that the state has authority to act outside the rule of law in extreme circumstances (e.g. a state of emergency) in the name of the public good.  Works in the series also criticize Richard Nixon's decision to remove the United States from the gold standard in 1971, and French television executive Patrick Le Lay who stated that his network's job was to sell Coca-Cola to its viewers via advertising, as opposed to providing content.

See also 

 City Lights
 Deluge Books
 Divided Publishing
 Haymarket Books
 McNally Editions
 Nightboat Books
 New York Review Books
 Pluto Press
 Tyrant Books
 Serpent's Tail
 Ugly Duckling Presse
 Verso Books
 Zero Books

Notes

References

Bibliography
 Sylvère Lotringer, "My 80s: Better Than Life," Artforum, April 2003
 Hedi El Kholti Chris Kraus Sylvère Lotringer: "SOMEWHERE IN THE UNFINISHED: The History of Semiotext(e) Part 2, Los Angeles,” Whitney Biennial Catalogue, Whitney Museum of Art, New York: 2014

External links

Autonomedia Website
David Rattray, New York Times obituary
Semiotext(e) titles at the MIT Press
The MIT Press Website

Book publishing companies based in California
Publishing companies established in 1974
Political book publishing companies
1974 establishments in the United States